{{automatic taxobox
|image=Duguetia moricandiana Mart. (8097971162).jpg
|taxon = Duguetia
|authority = A.St.-Hil.
|synonyms = 
Pachypodanthium Engler & DielsGeanthemum SaffordAlcmene Urban
|synonyms_ref =

}}Duguetia is a genus of trees and shrubs in the plant family Annonaceae with approximately 90 species in central and South America, and four species in west Africa.

 Species Duguetia aberrans  Maas Duguetia adiscandra  Jans.-Jac. Duguetia amazonica  R.E.Fr. Duguetia amplexifolia  R.E.Fr. Duguetia antioquensis  H.León & Maas Duguetia arenicola  Maas Duguetia aripuanae  Maas Duguetia asterotricha  R.E.Fr. Duguetia bahiensis  Maas Duguetia barteri  (Benth.) Chatrou Duguetia bracteosa  Mart. Duguetia brevipedunculata  (R.E.Fr.) R.E.Fr. Duguetia cadaverica  Huber Duguetia calycina  Benoist Duguetia candollei  Baill. Duguetia caniflora  León & Maas Duguetia caudata  R.E.Fr. Duguetia cauliflora  R.E.Fr. Duguetia chrysea  Maas Duguetia chrysocarpa  Maas Duguetia colombiana  Maas Duguetia confinis  (Engl. & Diels) Chatrou Duguetia confusa  Maas Duguetia coriacea  Sond. Duguetia cuspidata  R.E.Fr. Duguetia decurrens  R.E.Fr. Duguetia dicholepidata  Mart. Duguetia dicholepidota  Mart. Duguetia dilabens  Chatrou & Repetur Duguetia dimorphopetala  R.E.Fr. Duguetia duckei  R.E.Fr. Duguetia echinophora  R.E.Fr. Duguetia elegans  R.E.Fr. Duguetia elliptica  R.E.Fr. Duguetia eximia  Diels Duguetia flagellaris  Huber Duguetia friesii  Jans.-Jac. Duguetia furfuracea  (A.St.-Hil.) Saff. Duguetia gardneriana  Mart. Duguetia gentryi  Maas Duguetia glabra  Britton Duguetia glabriuscula  R.E.Fr. Duguetia granvilleana  Maas Duguetia guianensis  R.E.Fr. Duguetia hadrantha  (Diels) R.E.Fr. Duguetia hemmendorffii  R.E.Fr. Duguetia heteroclada  R.E.Fr. Duguetia ibonensis  Rusby Duguetia inconspicua  Sagot Duguetia insculpta  R.E.Fr. Duguetia jonasiana  (Barb.Rodr.) R.E.Fr. Duguetia lanceolata  A.St.-Hil. Duguetia latifolia  R.E.Fr. Duguetia leiophylla  Donn.Sm. Duguetia lepidota  (Miq.) Pulle Duguetia leptocarpa  Benth. ex R.E.Fr. Duguetia longicuspis  Benth. Duguetia longifolia  (Aubl.) Baill. Duguetia lucida  Urb. Duguetia macrocalyx  R.E.Fr. Duguetia macrophylla  R.E.Fr. Duguetia magnolioidea  Maas Duguetia magnoloidea  Maas Duguetia manausensis  Maas & Boon Duguetia marcgraviana  Mart. Duguetia megalocarpa  Maas Duguetia megalophylla  R.E.Fr. Duguetia microphylla  (R.E.Fr.) R.E.Fr. Duguetia moricandiana  Mart. Duguetia neglecta  Sandwith Duguetia nitida  Maas Duguetia oblanceolata  R.E.Fr. Duguetia oblongifolia  R.E.Fr. Duguetia obovata  R.E.Fr. Duguetia odorata  J.F.Macbr. Duguetia oligocarpa  Maas & J.A.C.Dam Duguetia panamensis  Standl. Duguetia paraensis  R.E.Fr. Duguetia pauciflora  Rusby Duguetia pedunculata  J.F.Macbr. Duguetia peruviana  J.F.Macbr. Duguetia phaeoclados  (Mart.) Maas & H.Rainer Duguetia pohliana  Mart. Duguetia pycnastera  Sandwith Duguetia quitarensis  Benth. Duguetia restingae  Maas Duguetia reticulata  Maas Duguetia rhizantha  (Eichler) Huber Duguetia riberensis  Aristeg. ex Maas & Boon Duguetia riedeliana  R.E.Fr. Duguetia rigida  R.E.Fr. Duguetia rionegrensis  Zuilen & Maas Duguetia riparia  Huber Duguetia rostrata  Rusby Duguetia rotundifolia  R.E.Fr. Duguetia ruboides  Maas & He Duguetia salicifolia  R.E.Fr. Duguetia sanctae-crucis  S.Moore Duguetia sancticaroli  Maas Duguetia sancticarolii  Maas Duguetia sandwithii  R.E.Fr. Duguetia schlechtendaliana  Mart. Duguetia schulzii  Jans.-Jac. Duguetia scottmorii  Maas Duguetia sessilis  (Vell.) Maas Duguetia sooretamae  Maas Duguetia spixiana  Mart. Duguetia spruceana  R.E.Fr. Duguetia staudtii  (Engl. & Diels) Chatrou Duguetia stenantha  R.E.Fr. Duguetia subcordata  Maas & J.A.C.Dam Duguetia surinamensis  R.E.Fr. Duguetia tenuis  R.E.Fr. Duguetia tessmannii  R.E.Fr. Duguetia tobagensis  R.E.Fr. Duguetia trichostemon  R.E.Fr. Duguetia trunciflora  Maas & Gentry Duguetia tuberculata  Maas Duguetia ulei  (Diels) R.E.Fr. Duguetia uniflora  Mart. Duguetia vallicola  J.F.Macbr. Duguetia vaupesana  Westra & Maas Duguetia venezuelana  R.E.Fr. Duguetia yeshidan''  Sandwith

References 

Annonaceae
Annonaceae genera
Flora of Central America
Flora of South America